Frank Uhlmann FRS is a group leader at the Francis Crick Institute in London.

Education
Uhlmann was educated at the University of Tübingen where he was awarded a PhD in 1997. During his PhD, he worked with Jerard Hurwitz at the Memorial Sloan Kettering Cancer Center in New York City.

Career
Following his PhD, Uhlmann moved to the Research Institute of Molecular Pathology in Vienna for postdoctoral research with Kim Nasmyth. In 2000, he established a laboratory at the Imperial Cancer Research Fund (now Cancer Research UK) in London, which ultimately became part of the Francis Crick Institute.

Awards and honours
Uhlmann was elected a Fellow of the Royal Society (FRS) in 2015. His certificate of election reads: 

In 2006, Uhlmann was also elected a member of the European Molecular Biology Organization (EMBO) and awarded the EMBO Gold Medal.

References

Living people
Members of the European Molecular Biology Organization
Fellows of the Royal Society
Year of birth missing (living people)
Academics of the Francis Crick Institute